Photographing a Ghost (1898) is a short film that was directed by George Albert Smith. It is about photographers that try to take a picture of a ghost, but they repeatedly fail.

See also
 List of ghost films

References

External links

1898 films
1898 horror films
1890s British films
British black-and-white films
British silent short films
British ghost films
Films about photographers
Films directed by George Albert Smith
1890s ghost films
1898 short films
Silent horror films